Kim Tae-hwan (born 24 July 1989) is a South Korean football player who plays for K League 1 side Ulsan Hyundai.

Club career

FC Seoul
Kim practiced football at University of Ulsan. He was selected by FC Seoul in 2009 K-League Draft. He made his K-League debut match against Ulsan Hyundai on 18 April 2010. and he scored his league first goal on 23 October 2011 against Seongnam Ilwha. He played 55 games and scored 2 goals at FC Seoul in 2010~2012.

Seongnam Ilwha
On 21 December 2012, Kim transferred to Seongnam Ilhwa Chunma for ￡264 thousand. He played 74 games and scored 8 goals at Seongnam FC in 2013~2014.

Ulsan Hyundai
On 1 February 2015, Kim transferred to Ulsan Hyundai for unknown fee.

International career
15 March 2011, Kim Tae-hwan received his first call up for South Korea national football team.

Career statistics

Club

1Includes K League Cup and K League Promotion-Relegation Playoffs.

International

Honours

Club
FC Seoul
K League 1 (2): 2010, 2012
K-League Cup (1): 2010

Seongnam FC
FA Cup (1): 2014

Ulsan Hyundai
AFC Champions League (1): 2020
K League 1 (1): 2022

International
South Korea
EAFF E-1 Football Championship (1): 2019

Individual
K League 1 Best XI (3): 2019, 2020, 2022

References

External links
 
 https://web.archive.org/web/20150215083043/https://www.football.com/en/tae-hwan-kim/ football.com
 Kim's Instagram https://www.instagram.com/holichwan/

1989 births
Living people
Association football midfielders
South Korean footballers
FC Seoul players
Seongnam FC players
Ulsan Hyundai FC players
Gimcheon Sangmu FC players
K League 1 players
Sportspeople from Gwangju
2022 FIFA World Cup players